In mathematics, geometric calculus extends the geometric algebra to include differentiation and integration.  The formalism is powerful and can be shown to encompass other mathematical theories including differential geometry and differential forms.

Differentiation

With a geometric algebra given, let  and  be vectors and let  be a multivector-valued function of a vector.

provided that the limit exists for all , where the limit is taken for scalar .  This is similar to the usual definition of a directional derivative but extends it to functions that are not necessarily scalar-valued.

Next, choose a set of basis vectors  and consider the operators, denoted , that perform directional derivatives in the directions of :

Then, using the Einstein summation notation, consider the operator:

which means

where the geometric product is applied after the directional derivative.  More verbosely:

This operator is independent of the choice of frame, and can thus be used to define what in geometric calculus is called the vector derivative:

This is similar to the usual definition of the gradient, but it, too, extends to functions that are not necessarily scalar-valued.

The directional derivative is linear regarding its direction, that is:

From this follows that the directional derivative is the inner product of its direction by the vector derivative.  All needs to be observed is that the direction  can be written , so that:

For this reason,  is often noted .

The standard order of operations for the vector derivative is that it acts only on the function closest to its immediate right.

Product rule

Although the partial derivative exhibits a product rule, the vector derivative only partially inherits this property.  Consider two functions  and :

A solution is to adopt the overdot notation, in which the scope of a vector derivative with an overdot is the multivector-valued function sharing the same overdot. In this case, if we define

then the product rule for the vector derivative is

Interior and exterior derivative

Let  be an -grade multivector.  Then we can define an additional pair of operators, the interior and exterior derivatives,

In particular, if  is grade 1 (vector-valued function), then we can write

and identify the divergence and curl as

Unlike the vector derivative, neither the interior derivative operator nor the exterior derivative operator is invertible.

Multivector derivative

The derivative with respect to a vector as discussed above can be generalized to a derivative with respect to a general multivector, called the multivector derivative.

Let  be a multivector-valued function of a multivector.

where  is the scalar product. With  a vector basis and  the corresponding dual basis, the multivector derivative is defined in terms of the directional derivative as

where  is denoting an ordered set of basis vector indices, as in the article section Geometric algebra#Dual basis. This equation is just expressing  in terms of components in a reciprocal basis of blades, as discussed in that article section.

A key property of the multivector derivative is that

The multivector derivative finds applications in Lagrangian field theory.

Integration

Let  be a set of basis vectors that span an -dimensional vector space.  From geometric algebra, we interpret the pseudoscalar  to be the signed volume of the -parallelotope subtended by these basis vectors.  If the basis vectors are orthonormal, then this is the unit pseudoscalar.

A general -volume of the -parallelotope subtended by these basis vectors is the grade  multivector .

We are free to choose components as infinitesimally small as we wish as long as they remain nonzero. Since the outer product of these terms can be interpreted as a -volume, a natural way to define a measure is

The measure is therefore always proportional to the unit pseudoscalar of a -dimensional subspace of the vector space.  Compare the Riemannian volume form in the theory of differential forms.  The integral is taken with respect to this measure:

More formally, consider some directed volume  of the subspace. We may divide this volume into a sum of simplices. Let  be the coordinates of the vertices. At each vertex we assign a measure  as the average measure of the simplices sharing the vertex.

Fundamental theorem of geometric calculus

The reason for defining the vector derivative and integral as above is that they allow a strong generalization of Stokes' theorem.  Let  be a multivector-valued function of -grade input  and general position , linear in its first argument.  Then the fundamental theorem of geometric calculus relates the integral of a derivative over the volume  to the integral over its boundary:

As an example, let  for a vector-valued function  and a -grade multivector .  We find that

Likewise,

Thus we recover the divergence theorem,

Covariant derivative

A sufficiently smooth -surface in an -dimensional space is deemed a manifold.  To each point on the manifold, we may attach a -blade  that is tangent to the manifold.  Locally,  acts as a pseudoscalar of the -dimensional space.  This blade defines a projection of vectors onto the manifold:

Just as the vector derivative  is defined over the entire -dimensional space, we may wish to define an intrinsic derivative , locally defined on the manifold:

(Note: The right hand side of the above may not lie in the tangent space to the manifold.

If  is a vector tangent to the manifold, then indeed both the vector derivative and intrinsic derivative give the same directional derivative:

Although this operation is perfectly valid, it is not always useful because  itself is not necessarily on the manifold.  Therefore, we define the covariant derivative to be the forced projection of the intrinsic derivative back onto the manifold:

Since any general multivector can be expressed as a sum of a projection and a rejection, in this case

we introduce a new function, the shape tensor , which satisfies

where  is the commutator product.  In a local coordinate basis  spanning the tangent surface, the shape tensor is given by

Importantly, on a general manifold, the covariant derivative does not commute.  In particular, the commutator is related to the shape tensor by

Clearly the term  is of interest.  However it, like the intrinsic derivative, is not necessarily on the manifold.  Therefore, we can define the Riemann tensor to be the projection back onto the manifold:

Lastly, if  is of grade , then we can define interior and exterior covariant derivatives as

and likewise for the intrinsic derivative.

Relation to differential geometry

On a manifold, locally we may assign a tangent surface spanned by a set of basis vectors .  We can associate the components of a metric tensor, the Christoffel symbols, and the Riemann curvature tensor as follows:

These relations embed the theory of differential geometry within geometric calculus.

Relation to differential forms

In a local coordinate system, the coordinate differentials , ...,  form a basic set of one-forms within the coordinate chart.

We can alternatively introduce a -grade multivector  as

and a measure

Apart from a subtle difference in meaning for the exterior product with respect to differential forms versus the exterior product with respect to vectors (in the former the increments are covectors, whereas in the latter they represent scalars), we see the correspondences of the differential form

its derivative

and its Hodge dual

embed the theory of differential forms within geometric calculus.

History 

Following is a diagram summarizing the history of geometric calculus.

References and further reading 

Applied mathematics
Calculus
Geometric algebra